Robert C. Monnett (February 27, 1910 – August 2, 1978) was a professional American football player who played halfback  for six seasons for the  Green Bay Packers.  He was inducted into the Green Bay Packers Hall of Fame in 1973.

Monnett retired following several injuries.  Returning to Ohio, he became a sales representative.

Robert Monnett died in Galion, Ohio.

References

External links
 

1910 births
1978 deaths
American football halfbacks
Green Bay Packers players
Michigan State Spartans football players
People from Bucyrus, Ohio
Players of American football from Ohio